Her Greatest Inspirational Songs is a compilation album by Amy Grant. Focusing on songs from the early years of Grant's career from 1977 to 1985. It was released after Sony BMG acquired the rights to the catalog spanning that period.

Track listing

Charts

References

Amy Grant compilation albums
2002 compilation albums
RCA Records compilation albums